Norman Hook (1898 – 20 May 1976) was an Anglican dean in the second quarter of the 20th century. Born in 1898 he was educated at Durham University (St Chad's Hall) and ordained in 1921. Following  curacies in  Liverpool he held incumbencies at Enborne, West Norwood and Knutsford. In 1945 he was appointed Rural Dean of Wimbledon and became a Canon of Southwark Cathedral. From 1953 until 1969  he was Dean of Norwich. An eminent author, he died on  20 May 1976.

Arms

Notes

1898 births
1976 deaths
Alumni of St Chad's College, Durham
Deans of Norwich